GeoAccess, Inc. was a company that pioneered the use of geographic data to analyze the accessibility of health care networks. Prior to GeoAccess’ work in the early 1990s, the accessibility of health care networks was estimated by comparing zip codes of health care providers and consumers.

GeoAccess developed software applications which allowed employers and government-sponsored programs accessibility to measure health care networks accurately based on the geographic coordinates of health care provider locations.

By the mid-1990s, GeoAccess-based analysis was the industry standard for measuring the accessibility of health care networks.

History 
GeoAccess was founded in 1990 by Stu Bauman and Tom Lauerman, who both previously consulted for Tillinghast, a Towers Perrin company. The company was headquartered in Lenexa, Kansas. The corporate structure in GeoAccess was unorthodox for its time. The company used no job titles, nor had private offices with the founders sharing an office.

For three years beginning in 1996, Inc. magazine recognized GeoAccess as one of the 500 fastest-growing private companies in the United States. The company was also the recipient of numerous technology and business awards.

In 1999, Ernst & Young recognized Bauman and Lauerman with the Technology Entrepreneur of the Year Award for the Central Midwest region.

In 2000, GeoAccess acquired Sweetwater Health Enterprises, a medical credentialing service provider.

In 2001, GeoAccess acquired two additional medical credentialing service providers: HealthCheck and VeriTrac.

In June 2002, GeoAccess was acquired by UnitedHealth Group. At the time of acquisition, GeoAccess had revenue of over $30 million and more than 300 employees.

References 

Consulting firms established in 1990
GIS companies